Beorn of Sweden - Swedish: Björn - may refer to:

Björn Ironside or Beorn Ironsides, legendary Swea ruler, 9th century
Björn at Haugi or Beorn at the Mound, legendary Swea ruler, 9th century
Björn (III) Eriksson or Beorn (III), Swedish king, died in 932
Styrbjörn the Strong or Beorn the Strident and Strong, Swedish prince, died about 984